In Buddhism, Avalokiteśvara (Sanskrit: अवलोकितेश्वर,) is a bodhisattva who embodies the compassion of all Buddhas and is the principal attendant of Amitabha Buddha at the right. He has 108 avatars, one notable avatar being Padmapāṇi (lotus bearer). He is variably depicted, described, and portrayed in different cultures as either male or female. In East Asian Buddhism, he has evolved into a female form called Guanyin.

Etymology
The name Avalokiteśvara combines the verbal prefix ava "down", lokita, a past participle of the verb lok "to notice, behold, observe", here used in an active sense; and finally īśvara, "lord", "ruler", "sovereign" or "master". In accordance with sandhi (Sanskrit rules of sound combination), a+īśvara becomes eśvara. Combined, the parts mean "lord who gazes down (at the world)". The word loka ("world") is absent from the name, but the phrase is implied. It does appear in the Cambodian form of the name, Lokesvarak.

The earliest translation of the name Avalokiteśvara into Chinese by authors such as Xuanzang was as Guānzìzài, not the form used in East Asian Buddhism today, Guanyin. It was initially thought that this was due to a lack of fluency, as Guanyin indicates the original Sanskrit form was instead Avalokitasvara, "who looked down upon sound", i.e., the cries of sentient beings who need help. It is now understood Avalokitasvara was the original form,  and is also the origin of Guanyin "Perceiving sound, cries". This translation was favored by the tendency of some Chinese translators, notably Kumārajīva, to use the variant  Guānshìyīn "who perceives the world's lamentations"—wherein lok was read as simultaneously meaning both "to look" and "world" (Sanskrit loka). The original form Avalokitasvara appears in Sanskrit fragments of the fifth century.

This earlier Sanskrit name was supplanted by the form containing the ending -īśvara "lord"; but Avalokiteśvara does not occur in Sanskrit before the seventh century.

The original meaning of the name fits the Buddhist understanding of the role of a bodhisattva. The reinterpretation presenting him as an īśvara shows a strong influence of Hinduism, as the term īśvara was usually connected to the Hindu notion of Vishnu (in Vaishnavism) or Shiva (in Shaivism) as the Supreme Lord, Creator and Ruler of the world. Some attributes of such a god were transmitted to the bodhisattva, but the mainstream of those who venerated Avalokiteśvara upheld the Buddhist rejection of the doctrine of any creator god.

In Sanskrit, Avalokiteśvara is also referred to as Lokeśvara ("Lord of the World"). In Tibetan, Avalokiteśvara is Chenrézig, and is said to emanate as the Dalai Lama, the Karmapa and other high lamas. An etymology of the Tibetan name Chenrézik is spyan "eye", ras "continuity" and gzig "to look". This gives the meaning of one who always looks upon all beings (with the eye of compassion).

Origin

Mahayana account

The name Avalokiteśvara first appeared in the Avatamsaka Sutra, a Mahayana scripture that precedes the Lotus Sutra. On account of its popularity in Japan and as a result of the works of the earliest Western translators of Buddhist Scriptures, the Lotus Sutra, however, has long been accepted as the earliest literature teaching about the doctrines of Avalokiteśvara. These are found in Chapter 25 of the Lotus Sutra: The Universal Gate of Bodhisattva Avalokiteśvara. This chapter is devoted to Avalokiteśvara, describing him as a compassionate bodhisattva who hears the cries of sentient beings and who works tirelessly to help those who call upon his name. A total of 33 different manifestations of Avalokiteśvara are described, including female manifestations, all to suit the minds of various beings. The chapter consists of both a prose and a verse section. This earliest source often circulates separately as its own sutra, called the Avalokiteśvara Sūtra, and is commonly recited or chanted at Buddhist temples in East Asia.

When the Chinese monk Faxian traveled to Mathura in India around 400 CE, he wrote about monks presenting offerings to Avalokiteśvara. When Xuanzang traveled to India in the 7th century, he provided eyewitness accounts of Avalokiteśvara statues being venerated by devotees from all walks of life, from kings to monks to laypeople.

In Chinese Buddhism and East Asia, Tangmi practices for the 18-armed form of Avalokiteśvara called Cundī are very popular. The popularity of Cundī is attested by the three extant translations of the Cundī Dhāraṇī Sūtra from Sanskrit to Chinese, made from the end of the seventh century to the beginning of the eighth century. In late imperial China, these early esoteric traditions still thrived in Buddhist communities. Robert Gimello has also observed that in these communities, the esoteric practices of Cundī were extremely popular among both the populace and the elite.

In the Tiantai school, six forms of Avalokiteśvara are defined. Each of the bodhisattva's six qualities is said to break the hindrances in one of the six realms of existence: hell-beings, pretas, animals, humans, asuras, and devas.

According to the prologue of Nīlakaṇṭha Dhāraṇī Sūtra, Gautama Buddha told his disciple Ānanda that Avalokiteśvara had become a Buddha from countless previous incarnations ago, alias "Wisdom of the Right Dharma Tathāgata." Because of his great compassion and because he wanted to create proper conditions for all the Bodhisattva ranks and bring happiness and peacefulness to sentient living beings, he became a Bodhisattva, taking the title of Quan Avalokiteshvara and often abiding in the Sahā world. At the same time, Avalokiteśvara is also the attendant of Amitabha Buddha, assisting Amitabha Buddha to teach the Dharma in his Pure Land.

Theravāda account

Veneration of Avalokiteśvara Bodhisattva has continued to the present day in Sri Lanka.

In times past, both Tantrayana and Mahayana have been found in some of the Theravada countries, but today the Buddhism of Sri Lanka (formerly, Ceylon), Myanmar (formerly, Burma), Thailand, Laos, and Cambodia is almost exclusively Theravada, based on the Pali Canon. The only Mahayana deity that has entered the worship of ordinary Buddhists in Theravada Buddhism is Bodhisattva Avalokitesvara. In Sri Lanka, he is known as Natha-deva and is mistaken by the majority for the Buddha yet to come, Bodhisattva Maitreya. The figure of Avalokitesvara is usually found in the shrine room near the Buddha image.

In more recent times, some western-educated Theravādins have attempted to identify Nātha with Maitreya Bodhisattva; however, traditions and basic iconography (including an image of Amitābha Buddha on the front of the crown) identify Nātha as Avalokiteśvara. Andrew Skilton writes:

Avalokiteśvara is popularly worshipped in Myanmar, where he is called Lokanat or lokabyuharnat, and Thailand, where he is called Lokesvara. The bodhisattva goes by many other names. In Indochina and Thailand, he is Lokesvara, "The Lord of the World." In Tibet, he is Chenrezig, also spelled Spyan-ras gzigs, "With a Pitying Look." In China, the bodhisattva takes a female form and is called Guanyin (also spelled Kwan Yin, Kuanyin, or Kwun Yum), "Hearing the Sounds of the World." In Japan, Guanyin is Kannon or Kanzeon; in Korea, Gwaneum; and in Vietnam, Quan Am.

Modern scholarship
Avalokiteśvara is worshipped as Nātha in Sri Lanka. The Tamil Buddhist tradition developed in Chola literature, such as Buddamitra's Virasoliyam, states that the Vedic sage Agastya learned Tamil from Avalokiteśvara. The earlier Chinese traveler Xuanzang recorded a temple dedicated to Avalokitesvara in the south Indian Mount Potalaka, a Sanskritization of Pothigai, where Tamil Hindu tradition places Agastya as having learned the Tamil language from Shiva. Avalokitesvara worship gained popularity with the growth of the Abhayagiri vihāra's Tamraparniyan Mahayana sect.

Western scholars have not reached a consensus on the origin of the reverence for Avalokiteśvara. Some have suggested that Avalokiteśvara, along with many other supernatural beings in Buddhism, was a borrowing or absorption by Mahayana Buddhism of one or more deities from Hinduism, in particular Shiva or Vishnu. This seems to be based on the name Avalokiteśvara.

On the basis of study of Buddhist scriptures, ancient Tamil literary sources, as well as a field survey, the Japanese scholar Shu Hikosaka proposes the hypothesis that the ancient Mount Potalaka, the residence of Avalokiteśvara described in the Gaṇḍavyūha Sūtra and Xuanzang’s Great Tang Records on the Western Regions, is the real Pothigai in Ambasamudram, Tirunelveli, at the Tamil Nadu-Kerala border. Shu also says that Mount Potalaka has been a sacred place for the people of South India from time immemorial. It is the traditional residence of Siddhar Agastya, at Agastya Mala. With the spread of Buddhism in the region beginning at the time of the great king Aśoka in the third century BCE, it became a holy place also for Buddhists, who gradually became dominant as a number of their hermits settled there. The local people, though, mainly remained followers of the Tamil Animist religion. The mixed Tamil-Buddhist cult culminated in the formation of the figure of Avalokiteśvara.

The name Lokeśvara should not be confused with that of Lokeśvararāja, the Buddha under whom Dharmakara became a monk and made forty-eight vows before becoming Amitābha.

Mantras and Dharanis

Mahāyāna Buddhism relates Avalokiteśvara to the six-syllable mantra .

In Tibetan Buddhism, due to his association with this mantra, one form of Avalokiteśvara is called Ṣaḍākṣarī "Lord of the Six Syllables" in Sanskrit. Recitation of this mantra while using prayer beads is the most popular religious practice in Tibetan Buddhism. Another popular religious practice associated with om mani padme hum is the spinning of prayer wheels clockwise which contains numerous repetitions of this mantra which effectively benefits everyone within the vicinity of the practitioner. This text is dated to around the late 4th century CE to the early 5th century CE. In this sūtra, a bodhisattva is told by the Buddha that recitation of this mantra while focusing on the sound can lead to the attainment of eight hundred samādhis. The  also features the first appearance of the dhāraṇī of Cundī, which occurs at the end of the sūtra text. After the bodhisattva finally attains samādhi with the mantra "oṃ maṇipadme hūṃ", he is able to observe 77 koṭīs of fully enlightened buddhas replying to him in one voice with the Cundī Dhāraṇī: 

Another mantra for Avalokiteśvara commonly recited in East Asian Buddhism is Om Arolik Svaha. In Chinese, it is pronounced Ǎn ālǔlēi jì suōpóhē (唵 阿嚕勒繼 娑婆訶). In Korean, it is pronounced Om aroreuk Ge Sabaha (옴 아로늑계 사바하). In Japanese, it is pronounced On arori kya sowa ka (おん あろりきゃ そわか).

The Nīlakaṇṭha Dhāraṇī is an 82-syllable dhāraṇī for Avalokiteśvara.

Thousand-armed Avalokiteśvara

One prominent Buddhist story tells of Avalokiteśvara vowing never to rest until he had freed all sentient beings from saṃsāra. Despite strenuous effort, he realizes that many unhappy beings were yet to be saved. After struggling to comprehend the needs of so many, his head splits into eleven pieces. Amitābha, seeing his plight, gives him eleven heads with which to hear the cries of the suffering. Upon hearing these cries and comprehending them, Avalokiteśvara tries to reach out to all those who needed aid, but found that his two arms shattered into pieces. Once more, Amitābha comes to his aid and invests him with a thousand arms with which to aid the suffering multitudes.

The Bao'en Temple located in northwestern Sichuan has an outstanding wooden image of the Thousand-Armed Avalokiteśvara, an example of Ming dynasty decorative sculpture.

Tibetan Buddhist beliefs
Avalokiteśvara is an important deity in Tibetan Buddhism. He is regarded in the Vajrayana teachings as a Buddha.

In Tibetan Buddhism, Tãrã came into existence from a single tear shed by Avalokiteśvara. When the tear fell to the ground it created a lake, and a lotus opening in the lake revealed Tara. In another version of this story, Tara emerges from the heart of Avalokiteśvara. In either version, it is Avalokiteśvara's outpouring of compassion which manifests Tãrã as a being.

Manifestations

Avalokiteśvara has an extraordinarily large number of manifestations in different forms (including wisdom goddesses (vidyaas) directly associated with him in images and texts). Some of the more commonly mentioned forms include:

Gallery

See also 
 Guanyin
 Ishvara
 Pure Land Buddhism
 Ushnishasitatapattra
 Vishnu
 Dalai Lama

References

Sources
  
 
  ill. colour

External links

 The Origin of Avalokiteshvara of Potala
 An Explanation of the Name Avalokiteshvara
 The Bodhisattva of Compassion and Spiritual Emanation of Amitabha - from Buddhanature.com
 Depictions at the Bayon in Cambodia of Avalokiteshvara as the Khmer King Jayavarman VII
 Mantra Avalokitesvara
 Avalokiteshvara at Britannica.com
 Chenrezig Tibetan Buddhist Center of Philadelphia

 
Bodhisattvas
Buddhist tantras
Yidams